Johann Gottfried Vierling (January 25, 1750 – November 22, 1813) was a German organist and composer.

Life and career
Vierling was born in Metzels. From 1763 he studied at the Lyzeum in Schmalkalden. In 1768 he succeeded his teacher Johann Nikolaus Tischer (1707–74) as organist in Schmalkalden. He later continued his musical studies with Carl Philipp Emanuel Bach and Johann Philipp Kirnberger. Vierling died in Schmalkalden.

Vierling composed several collections of easy organ pieces, a four-voice organ chorale book (1790) and cembalo music such as two trios, one quartet and six sonatas. Two handwritten annual volumes of Kirchenkantaten are preserved. He also published a handbook on the art of basso continuo, "Allgemein faßlicher Unterricht im Generalbaß".

Among Vierling's students was Johann Christian Friedrich Hæffner, who became a famous musician in Sweden.

Works
Achtundvierzig kurze und leichte Orgelstücke
48 leichte Choralvorspiele, Leipzig
Sonata in C-major for cembalo / organ
Prelude in c-minor for organ
About 160 cantatas
Choralbuch auf vier Stimmen zum Gebrauch bey dem öffentlichen- und Privat-Gottesdienst : nebst e. Vorrede u. kurzen Vorbericht mit e. Haupt- u. Melodien-Register / hrsg. von Johann Gottfried Vierling, 1789
Allgemein fasslicher Unterricht im Generalbass mit Rücksicht auf dem jetzt herrschenden Geschmack in der Composition durch treffende Beispiele erläutert, Leipzig, 1805
Versuch einer Anleitung zum Präludiren für Ungeübtere, Leipzig, 1794
Empfindung und Empfindelei oder Die Verwechslung der Geliebten (opera)

Sources and further reading
Höijer, J.L: Musik-Lexikon
Klais musical scores
Cornell university, USA
Sorbonne university, Paris

dolmetsch online music dictionary

External links

1750 births
1813 deaths
18th-century German people
18th-century keyboardists
18th-century classical composers
German classical organists
German male organists
German opera composers
Male opera composers
People from Schmalkalden-Meiningen
People from Saxe-Meiningen
German male classical composers
18th-century German composers
18th-century German male musicians
Male classical organists